Mario Hernández is a Colombian fashion house dedicated to the manufacture of luxury leather accessories based in Bogotá D.C. It is named after its founder, Mario Hernandez (born 1941).

History
Mario Hernandez is an old entrepreneur, he started his clothing company in 1978 in Bogota, in a cheap district in the city, where it is still based. However, due to the economic climate in Colombia at the time, Hernandez was forced to borrow money.

By 1979, he reached an agreement with his creditors, which left him with just 3 sewing machines to restart his business.

The same year, he became a sensation in the Sanadresito for the quality of his products. He later in the 28 of march of 1999 stated that he had formed a little globalization within Colombia. After his brands became well known in his country, he moved into neighboring Venezuela and Panama. His sales increase came in North America, opening markets starting with Mexico to United States. In the 2000s, Mario Hernandez was known almost all over America and started to open up the European market, selling in luxury leather goods sales points.

Today Mario is recognized by important companies such as Johnnie Walker, who referred to him as ¨Walking with a Colombian giant¨.

Locations
As of 2008, Hernandez had 16 stores in Colombia, nine in Venezuela, four in Mexico and one in the United States.

As of 2016, the number of locations has expanded to 110 in six countries.

Product line
The fashion house manufactures bags, shoes, clothes, jewelry, etc., primarily using exotic leathers.

Manufacturing
Products are manufactured in Colombia as well as in Brazil by artisans. In the past the original name was Marroquineria SA.

References

External links

Mario Hernandez official website

Clothing companies of Colombia
Clothing brands of Colombia
Luxury brands
High fashion brands
Companies based in Bogotá
Design companies established in 1978
Clothing companies established in 1978
1978 establishments in Colombia